Kirwin is an unincorporated community in Park County, in the U.S. state of Wyoming. Its post office has been closed.

The former mining town is a historic site. Amelia Earhart was having a cabin built there before her disappearance.

References

Unincorporated communities in Park County, Wyoming
Unincorporated communities in Wyoming